Meitei Chanu (lit. "Meitei woman") is a Meitei language poem by Lamabam Kamal. It was first published in a magazine, with the same name, called Meitei Chanu (magazine) in the year 1924. It was republished in the author's book of his collection of poems called "Lei Pareng" in the year 1929. Its central theme is the reconfiguration of the identity of the Meitei people.
The poem bountifully reflects the poet's love of his motherland and its heritage.

Analysis 
The text of the poem shows the feminization of the language and its literature.
The opening stanza of the poem remarkably implies that the idea of a literary tradition is embodied in the form of a temple. The very literary temple is remaining empty without a goddess for a very long time. This metaphor is an important transformation in history as "Ema" or the "Meitei Chanu"  re-occupies the temple. The reasons why she could re-enter her former temple once again are attributed to western education, imitation and feminization of language and literature.

In association with the introduction of the poem, the poet gives emphasis on the original and the vernacular inspiration and the poetic elements to construct the temple of "Meitei Chanu" and the materials for prayers, thereby countering the common beliefs that Meitei language (as mentioned in the poem) was insufficient for literary expressions.

Besides the poet's desire to build a temple made of local materials, he also conceives, in his mind, a pan-Meitei consciousness through the Temple's construction, that could end the dormancy of the Meiteis who are Seerum-Naarumba Again, the call for the pan-Meitei unity was necessary to reconstruct the temple successfully.

The poet expresses that all the Meiteis should consider themselves as the children of "Meitei Chanu" so that the "Lei Pareng" (symbolising "unity") remains strong.

The whole idea of pan-Meitei concept is relevant to the author's position as nearness (as mentioned in the poem) becomes the central point of the Meitei world, thereby softly referring to Imphal as the cosmic holy place to the Meitei ethnicity.

In accordance to the author, the temple should be made up of flowers and its purpose should be to spread across the world and to bloom in the universities in India.

In the last stanza, the poet reminds, in a traumatised way, his idea of Meitei Chanu and the unity which he wished to weave around the "lei pareng" (garland) for the Meitei literature to cross the seas and to bloom in the Indian universities. The "lei pareng" (garland), that he describes, is the prophecy of the present day politics in Meitei society.

Notes

References

Bibliography 
 
 

1924 poems
Meitei folklore in popular culture
Meitei literature